Saamri is a Bollywood horror film released in 1985. It was produced and directed by Shyam and Tulsi Ramsay, with a story by J. K. Ahuja, dialogue by Mahendra Dehlvi and Safi Ur-Rahman, and a screenplay by Kumar Ramsay.

Plot 
Dharmesh Saxena, referred to as "Saamri", is a wealthy elderly man who is involved in dark magic. Aware that his health is fading fast, he arranges for his expansive estate to be left to his niece, Anju Trivedi. Dharmesh's stepbrother Takleefchand, however, has other plans, and he and a motley group of co-conspirators kill Dharmesh and inform authorities that it was a suicide. The next phase of their plan is to kill Anju, but before they can, they begin dying gruesomely. Saamri has risen from the grave to take his revenge.

Cast
 Anirudh Agarwal - Dharmesh Saxena "Saamri"
 Rajan Sippy - Sandeep
 Aarti Gupta - Anju Trivedi
 Puneet Issar - Police Inspector Baldev
 Asha Sachdev - Maria
 Gulshan Grover - Khanna
 Jagdeep - Changez Khan
 Prem Chopra - Mama Taklifchand
 Jack Gaud - Bhishan
 Amarnath Mukherjee - Professor

Soundtrack
The film had 5 songs which was composed by Bappi Lahiri and written by Farooq Qaiser & Kafeel Azar.

"Bacha Le" - Bappi Lahiri, Johnny Whisky, Anand Raaj
"Paani Mein Aag lagi" - Amit Kumar, S. Janaki
"Ladki Kaise" - Kishore Kumar
"Saamri Saamri" - Anup Jalota
3D Saamri (Title Track) - Bappi Lahiri

References

External links 
 

1985 films
1980s Hindi-language films
Indian horror films
Films scored by Bappi Lahiri
1985 horror films
Hindi-language horror films
Films directed by Shyam Ramsay
Films directed by Tulsi Ramsay